This article was split from List of museums in Texas.

The list of museums in South Texas encompasses museums defined for this context as institutions (including nonprofit organizations, government entities, and private businesses) that collect and care for objects of cultural, artistic, scientific, or historical interest and make their collections or related exhibits available for public viewing.  Museums that exist only in cyberspace (i.e., virtual museums) are not included.  Also included are non-profit art galleries and exhibit spaces.

South Texas
South Texas is a region of the US state of Texas that lies roughly south of and including San Antonio. The southern and western boundary is the Rio Grande, and to the east it is the Gulf of Mexico.

Counties included are Aransas, Atascosa, Bee, Brooks, Calhoun, Cameron, DeWitt, Dimmit, Duval, Edwards, Frio, Goliad, Gonzales, Guadalupe, Hidalgo, Jackson, Jim Hogg, Jim Wells, Karnes, Kenedy, Kinney, Kleberg, La Salle, Lavaca, Live Oak, Maverick, McMullen, Medina, Nueces, Real, Refugio, San Patricio, Starr, Uvalde, Val Verde, Victoria, Webb, Willacy, Zapata, Zavala County, Texas.

Museums

Aransas - Brooks

Calhoun -  Cameron

DeWitt - Frio

Goliad - Guadalupe

Hidalgo

Jackson - Kleberg

La Salle - Medina

Nueces - Starr

Uvalde  - Victoria

Webb  - Zapata

Defunct museums
 Alamo Village, Brackettville, movie and television shooting location, includes John Wayne Western Museum, closed in 2010
 Cool Cats Toy Museum, Corpus Christi

See also

 List of museums in Texas
 List of museums in East Texas
 List of museums in the Texas Gulf Coast
 List of museums in North Texas
 List of museums in the Texas Panhandle
 List of museums in Central Texas
 List of museums in West Texas

Resources
Texas Association of Museums
Texas Association of Museums (Archived)
Historic House Museums in Texas

References

Lists of museums in Texas